Herbert George-Williams is a Sierra Leonean politician and the former mayor of Freetown. Like Johnson, George-Williams also belongs to the Creole ethnic group. He was removed from office on various corruption charges but in the subsequent trial almost all were dismissed.

References

Year of birth missing (living people)
Living people
Mayors of Freetown
All People's Congress politicians
Sierra Leone Creole people